Cresconius may refer to:

 Flavius Cresconius Corippus, 6th-century poet
 Cresconius Africanus, 7th-century bishop
 Cresconius of Santiago de Compostela, 11th-century bishop